Endrit Hysenagolli (born 5 July 1988) is an Albanian professional basketball player for the BC Teuta Durrës of the Albanian Basketball Superliga. He plays the center position and has been a member of the Albania national team since 2006.

Achievements 
2018-19
Top 5 Balkan League, Top 5 Domestic League 

 Best Center Balkan League, Domestic League

References

1988 births
Living people
Albanian men's basketball players
Basketball players from Tirana
Albanian expatriates in Kosovo
Centers (basketball)
Bashkimi Prizren players